Helen Lee may refer to:

Helen Lee (fashion designer) (died 1991), American children's clothes designer
Helen Lee (artist) American artist and glassblower
Helen Lee (cricketer) (born 1943), Australian cricketer
Helen Lee (director) (born c. 1965), Korean-Canadian film director
Helen Lee (researcher), medical researcher and inventor
Yeh Yeh-chin, Chinese politician also known as Helen Lee